Zora "Bell" Folley (May 27, 1931 – July 7, 1972) was a mid-20th century American heavyweight boxer, known for his defensive game and punching ability.

Early life
Born in Dallas, Texas on 27 May 1931, Folley moved with his family to Chandler, Arizona in 1942, where he grew up playing baseball. Upon joining the U.S. Army in 1948, he began boxing and won the 6th Army Championship within a year, going on to win the All-Army and All-Service titles. He saw active service during the Korean War, earning five battle stars, and was discharged from the U.S. Army with the rank of Sergeant in 1953.

Boxing career
In the mid-1950s Folley signed a professional boxing contract, winning his first pro-fight against Jimmy Ingram, then after a draw, won seventeen straight victories until losing to Johnny Summerlin in six rounds with a suspected broken jaw after being knocked down three times. Despite being considered a top contender, Folley never faced heavyweight champion Floyd Patterson. This was partly due to his highly controversial points loss to Henry Cooper in England, in September 1958 (which was later avenged in December 1961 by a two-round knockout).

Major Bouts 
Folley beat contenders Eddie Machen, George Chuvalo, Bob Cleroux (twice), Oscar Bonavena (the first match was one sided with Bonavena being decked but Bonavena won the rematch three years later) and Doug Jones. He also had draws with Karl Mildenberger and Eddie Machen (their first fight). Between 1960 and 1962 Folley was knocked out by Sonny Liston, Alejandro Lavorante, and Doug Jones (in the rematch).

Title Shot 
It was not until March 22, 1967, aged 36, that he faced world heavyweight champion Muhammad Ali. Before their fight, Ali joked that Folley was such a nice man that it posed a real problem because he could not possibly get mad at him. Folley was one of the first to call the champion by his Muslim name instead of Cassius Clay. Ali stated he respected Folley and was nervous before the match. Folley was the last man to face Ali before Ali's three-year exile from boxing in 1967. Folley was knocked out in the 7th round. Folley fought for three more years afterward before being knocked out by Mac Foster in 1970.

Personal life
Folley served as a member of the Chandler City Council, and raised a family of nine children with his wife Joella (1933-2011).

In mysterious circumstances, Folley suffered severe head injuries in a motel swimming pool while visiting a friend in Tucson, Arizona on July 8, 1972, and died at the age of 41 in a local hospital shortly afterwards. The death was officially ruled to be accidental, but conspiracy theories regarding it persist. Folley's body was buried in the City of Mesa Cemetery, Mesa, Arizona.

The city of Chandler dedicated Zora Folley Memorial Park in his honor.

Professional boxing record

|-
|align="center" colspan=8|79 Wins (44 knockouts, 35 decisions), 11 Losses (7 knockouts, 4 decisions), 6 Draws 
|-
| align="center" style="border-style: none none solid solid; background: #e3e3e3"|Result
| align="center" style="border-style: none none solid solid; background: #e3e3e3"|Record
| align="center" style="border-style: none none solid solid; background: #e3e3e3"|Opponent
| align="center" style="border-style: none none solid solid; background: #e3e3e3"|Type
| align="center" style="border-style: none none solid solid; background: #e3e3e3"|Round
| align="center" style="border-style: none none solid solid; background: #e3e3e3"|Date
| align="center" style="border-style: none none solid solid; background: #e3e3e3"|Location
| align="center" style="border-style: none none solid solid; background: #e3e3e3"|Notes
|-align=center
|Loss
|79–11–6
|align=left| Mac Foster
|KO
|1
|29/09/1970
|align=left| Selland Arena, Fresno, California
|align=left|
|-
|Win
|79–10–6
|align=left| Billy Joiner
|UD
|10
|05/11/1969
|align=left| Silver Slipper, Las Vegas, Nevada
|align=left|
|-
|Win
|78–10–6
|align=left| Tommy Sims
|KO
|1
|16/06/1969
|align=left| Phoenix Municipal Stadium, Phoenix, Arizona
|align=left|
|-
|Win
|77–10–6
|align=left| Sonny Moore
|TKO
|4
|30/01/1969
|align=left| Silver Slipper, Las Vegas, Nevada
|align=left|
|-
|Loss
|76–10–6
|align=left| Oscar Bonavena
|MD
|10
|06/07/1968
|align=left| Estadio Luna Park, Buenos Aires
|align=left|
|-
|Draw
|76–9–6
|align=left| Al Jones
|SD
|10
|14/05/1968
|align=left| Miami Beach Convention Hall, Miami Beach, Florida
|align=left|
|-
|Draw
|76–9–5
|align=left| Roger Russell
|SD
|10
|11/03/1968
|align=left| Philadelphia Arena, Philadelphia
|
|-
|Loss
|76–9–4
|align=left| Brian London
|PTS
|10
|13/11/1967
|align=left| Liverpool Stadium, Liverpool, Merseyside
|
|-
|Win
|76–8–4
|align=left| Nick Sosa
|KO
|2
|04/10/1967
|align=left| Madison Square Garden, Phoenix, Arizona
|
|-
|Win
|75–8–4
|align=left| Wayne Kindred
|TKO
|8
|18/09/1967
|align=left| Silver Slipper, Las Vegas, Nevada
|
|-
|Loss
|74–8–4
|align=left| Muhammad Ali
|KO
|7
|22/03/1967
|align=left| Madison Square Garden, New York City
|align=left|
|-
|Win
|74–7–4
|align=left| Floyd Joyner
|KO
|1
|17/01/1967
|align=left| Sam Houston Coliseum, Houston, Texas
|
|-
|Win
|73–7–4
|align=left| Jefferson Davis
|UD
|10
|13/12/1966
|align=left| Houston, Texas
|align=left|
|-
|Win
|72–7–4
|align=left| Henry Clark
|UD
|10
|25/10/1966
|align=left| Sacramento Memorial Auditorium, Sacramento, California
|align=left|
|-
|Win
|71–7–4
|align=left| Jefferson Davis
|KO
|8
|28/06/1966
|align=left| Centennial Coliseum, Reno, Nevada
|align=left|
|-
|Win
|70–7–4
|align=left| Bob Foster
|UD
|10
|06/12/1965
|align=left| New Orleans Municipal Auditorium, New Orleans, Louisiana
|align=left|
|-
|Win
|69–7–4
|align=left| Oscar Bonavena
|UD
|10
|26/02/1965
|align=left| Madison Square Garden, New York City
|align=left|
|-
|Win
|68–7–4
|align=left| Gerhard Zech
|KO
|4
|14/11/1964
|align=left| Westfalenhallen, Dortmund, North Rhine-Westphalia
|align=left|
|-
|Draw
|67–7–4
|align=left| Karl Mildenberger
|PTS
|10
|17/04/1964
|align=left| Festhalle Frankfurt, Frankfurt, Hesse
|align=left|
|-
|Win
|67–7–3
|align=left| Tod Herring
|TKO
|7
|17/03/1964
|align=left| Houston, Texas
|align=left|
|-
|Win
|66–7–3
|align=left| George Chuvalo
|UD
|10
|17/01/1964
|align=left| Cleveland Arena, Cleveland, Ohio
|align=left|
|-
|Win
|65–7–3
|align=left| Billy Daniels
|UD
|10
|17/10/1963
|align=left| Paul Sauve Arena, Montreal, Quebec
|align=left|
|-
|Win
|64–7–3
|align=left| Tiger Lynch
|KO
|5
|19/09/1963
|align=left| Boise, Idaho
|align=left|
|-
|Loss
|63–7–3
|align=left| Ernie Terrell
|UD
|10
|27/07/1963
|align=left| Madison Square Garden, New York City
|align=left|
|-
|Win
|63–6–3
|align=left| Bob Cleroux
|UD
|10
|23/05/1963
|align=left| Paul Sauve Arena, Montreal, Quebec
|align=left|
|-
|Draw
|62–6–3
|align=left| Dean Bogany
|TD
|5
|02/04/1963
|align=left| Bakersfield Civic Auditorium, Bakersfield, California
|align=left|
|-
|Loss
|62–6–2
|align=left| Doug Jones
|KO
|7
|15/12/1962
|align=left| Madison Square Garden, New York City
|align=left|
|-
|Win
|62–5–2
|align=left| Dave Furch
|UD
|10
|19/11/1962
|align=left| Tucson, Arizona
|align=left|
|-
|Win
|61–5–2
|align=left| Al Gonzalez
|KO
|5
|29/08/1962
|align=left| Madison Square Garden, Phoenix, Arizona
|align=left|
|-
|Win
|60–5–2
|align=left| Doug Jones
|UD
|10
|01/08/1962
|align=left| Denver Auditorium Arena, Denver, Colorado
|align=left|
|-
|Win
|59–5–2
|align=left| Paul Andrews
|TKO
|7
|12/06/1962
|align=left| Sacramento, California
|align=left|
|-
|Win
|58–5–2
|align=left| Bob Cleroux
|UD
|10
|18/04/1962
|align=left| San Francisco Civic Auditorium, San Francisco, California
|align=left|
|-
|Win
|57–5–2
|align=left| Mike DeJohn
|KO
|3
|15/02/1962
|align=left| Denver Auditorium Arena, Denver, Colorado
|align=left|
|-
|Win
|56–5–2
|align=left| Henry Cooper
|KO
|2
|05/12/1961
|align=left| Empire Pool, Wembley, London
|align=left|
|-
|Win
|55–5–2
|align=left| Sonny Moore
|UD
|10
|28/09/1961
|align=left| El Paso County Coliseum, El Paso, Texas
|align=left|
|-
|Win
|54–5–2
|align=left| "Big" Ben Marshall
|KO
|2
|30/08/1961
|align=left| Madison Square Garden, Phoenix, Arizona
|align=left|
|-
|Loss
|53–5–2
|align=left| Alejandro Lavorante
|KO
|7
|11/05/1961
|align=left| Olympic Auditorium, Los Angeles
|align=left|
|-
|Win
|53–4–2
|align=left| Norman Letcher
|TKO
|5
|10/02/1961
|align=left| Madison Square Garden, Phoenix, Arizona
|align=left|
|-
|Win
|52–4–2
|align=left| Willi Besmanoff
|UD
|10
|16/09/1960
|align=left| SW Washington Fairgrounds, Centralia, Washington
|align=left|
|-
|Loss
|51–4–2
|align=left| Sonny Liston
|KO
|3
|18/07/1960
|align=left| Denver Coliseum, Denver, Colorado
|align=left|
|-
|Win
|51–3–2
|align=left| Clarence Williams
|UD
|10
|05/04/1960
|align=left| Sacramento, California
|align=left|
|-
|Win
|50–3–2
|align=left| Eddie Machen
|UD
|12
|18/01/1960
|align=left| Cow Palace, Daly City, California
|align=left|
|-
|Win
|49–3–2
|align=left| Alonzo Johnson
|UD
|10
|18/11/1959
|align=left| Caravan Inn East, Phoenix, Arizona
|align=left|
|-
|Win
|48–3–2
|align=left| Monroe Ratliff
|TKO
|2
|02/10/1959
|align=left| San Diego Arena, San Diego, California
|align=left|
|-
|Win
|47–3–2
|align=left| Howard King
|MD
|10
|04/08/1959
|align=left| Sacramento, California
|align=left|
|-
|Win
|46–3–2
|align=left| Alvin Williams
|KO
|4
|07/07/1959
|align=left| Fresno Memorial Auditorium, Fresno, California
|align=left|
|-
|Win
|45–3–2
|align=left| Willi Besmanoff
|UD
|10
|07/04/1959
|align=left| Denver, Colorado
|align=left|
|-
|Win
|44–3–2
|align=left| Hank Thurman
|UD
|10
|10/03/1959
|align=left| Madison Square Garden, Phoenix, Arizona
|align=left|
|-
|Win
|43–3–2
|align=left| Alex Miteff
|UD
|10
|29/01/1959
|align=left| Denver Auditorium Arena, Denver, Colorado
|align=left|
|-
|Win
|42–3–2
|align=left| Joe Bygraves
|TKO
|9
|24/11/1958
|align=left| Granby Halls, Leicester, Leicestershire
|align=left|
|-
|Loss
|41–3–2
|align=left| Henry Cooper
|PTS
|10
|14/10/1958
|align=left| Empire Pool, Wembley, London
|align=left|
|-
|Win
|41–2–2
|align=left| Pete Rademacher
|KO
|4
|25/07/1958
|align=left| Olympic Auditorium, Los Angeles
|align=left|
|-
|Win
|40–2–2
|align=left| Art Swiden
|UD
|10
|19/05/1958
|align=left| Las Vegas, Nevada
|align=left|
|-
|Draw
|39–2–2
|align=left| Eddie Machen
|SD
|12
|09/04/1958
|align=left| Cow Palace, Daly City, California
|align=left|
|-
|Win
|39–2–1
|align=left| Garvin Sawyer
|UD
|10
|01/01/1958
|align=left| Capitol Arena, Washington, D.C.
|align=left|
|-
|Win
|38–2–1
|align=left| Edgardo Romero
|TKO
|4
|04/12/1957
|align=left| Albuquerque Civic Auditorium, Albuquerque, New Mexico
|align=left|
|-
|Win
|37–2–1
|align=left| Duke Sabedong
|KO
|4
|21/11/1957
|align=left| Phoenix, Arizona
|align=left|
|-
|Win
|36–2–1
|align=left| Monroe Ratliff
|UD
|10
|10/09/1957
|align=left| Madison Square Garden, Phoenix, Arizona
|align=left|
|-
|Win
|35–2–1
|align=left| Edgardo Romero
|TKO
|6
|05/08/1957
|align=left| Dallas Memorial Auditorium, Dallas, Texas
|align=left|
|-
|Win
|34–2–1
|align=left| Jeff Dyer
|UD
|10
|09/07/1957
|align=left| Phoenix Coliseum, Phoenix, Arizona
|align=left|
|-
|Win
|33–2–1
|align=left| Julius Griffin
|TKO
|4
|18/06/1957
|align=left| Madison Square Garden, Phoenix, Arizona
|align=left|
|-
|Win
|32–2–1
|align=left| Jimmy Wood
|KO
|2
|20/05/1957
|align=left| Sports Center, Tucson, Arizona
|align=left|
|-
|Win
|31–2–1
|align=left| JD Harvey
|KO
|4
|18/04/1957
|align=left| Sports Arena, Yuma, Arizona
|align=left|
|-
|Win
|30–2–1
|align=left| Johnny Hollins
|KO
|2
|12/03/1957
|align=left| Madison Square Garden, Phoenix, Arizona
|align=left|
|-
|Win
|29–2–1
|align=left| Howie Turner
|UD
|10
|11/02/1957
|align=left| St. Nicholas Arena, New York City
|align=left|
|-
|Win
|28–2–1
|align=left| Wayne Bethea
|SD
|10
|09/01/1957
|align=left| Syracuse War Memorial Arena, Syracuse, New York
|align=left|
|-
|Win
|27–2–1
|align=left| Wayne Bethea
|SD
|10
|03/12/1956
|align=left| St. Nicholas Arena, New York City
|align=left|
|-
|Win
|26–2–1
|align=left| Nino Valdes
|UD
|10
|25/09/1956
|align=left| Softball Park, Phoenix, Arizona
|align=left|
|-
|Win
|25–2–1
|align=left| Roger Rischer
|UD
|12
|15/08/1956
|align=left| Madison Square Garden, Phoenix, Arizona
|align=left|
|-
|Win
|24–2–1
|align=left| Rocky Robinson
|KO
|8
|28/05/1956
|align=left| Sports Center, Tucson, Arizona
|align=left|
|-
|Win
|23–2–1
|align=left| Ponce DeLeon Taylor
|KO
|7
|08/05/1956
|align=left| Phoenix Municipal Stadium, Phoenix, Arizona
|align=left|
|-
|Win
|22–2–1
|align=left| Alex Watson Jones
|KO
|3
|28/02/1956
|align=left| Phoenix, Arizona
|align=left|
|-
|Loss
|21–2–1
|align=left| Young Jack Johnson
|RTD
|5
|01/12/1955
|align=left| Olympic Auditorium, Los Angeles
|align=left|
|-
|Win
|21–1–1
|align=left| Reuben Wilson
|KO
|8
|24/09/1955
|align=left| Clifton, Arizona
|align=left|
|-
|Win
|20–1–1
|align=left| Ted Calaman
|TKO
|4
|08/09/1955
|align=left| Olympic Auditorium, Los Angeles
|align=left|
|-
|Win
|19–1–1
|align=left| Jack Jarrod
|TKO
|7
|28/07/1955
|align=left| Olympic Auditorium, Los Angeles
|align=left|
|-
|Loss
|18–1–1
|align=left| Johnny Summerlin
|RTD
|6
|23/06/1955
|align=left| Olympic Auditorium, Los Angeles
|align=left|
|-
|Win
|18–0–1
|align=left| Howard King
|TKO
|1
|16/05/1955
|align=left| Kezar Stadium, San Francisco, California
|align=left|
|-
|Win
|17–0–1
|align=left| Calvin Brad
|TKO
|7
|07/04/1955
|align=left| Olympic Auditorium, Los Angeles
|align=left|
|-
|Win
|16–0–1
|align=left| Kirby Seals
|TKO
|5
|24/02/1955
|align=left| Olympic Auditorium, Los Angeles
|align=left|
|-
|Win
|15–0–1
|align=left| JD Reed
|TKO
|8
|20/01/1955
|align=left| Olympic Auditorium, Los Angeles
|align=left|
|-
|Win
|14–0–1
|align=left|Kid Zanzibar
|KO
|7
|18/12/1954
|align=left| Clifton, Arizona
|align=left|
|-
|Win
|13–0–1
|align=left| Jimmy Ingram
|PTS
|10
|26/11/1954
|align=left| Madison Square Garden, Phoenix, Arizona
|align=left|
|-
|Win
|12–0–1
|align=left| Georgie Woods
|PTS
|10
|23/10/1954
|align=left| Madison Square Garden, Phoenix, Arizona
|align=left|
|-
|Win
|11–0–1
|align=left| Sandy McPherson
|UD
|8
|01/10/1954
|align=left| Edmonton Gardens, Edmonton, Alberta
|align=left|
|-
|Win
|10–0–1
|align=left| Kid Percy
|KO
|N/A
|28/08/1954
|align=left| Clifton, Arizona
|align=left|
|-
|Win
|9–0–1
|align=left| Kirby Seals
|UD
|10
|13/08/1954
|align=left| San Diego Coliseum, San Diego, California
|align=left|
|-
|Win
|8–0–1
|align=left| Frank Buford
|UD
|10
|12/07/1954
|align=left| Tucson, Arizona
|align=left|
|-
|Win
|7–0–1
|align=left| Johnny Rebel
|KO
|1
|10/06/1954
|align=left| Phoenix, Arizona
|align=left|
|-
|Win
|6–0–1
|align=left| Joe Sandell
|TKO
|3
|13/04/1954
|align=left| Softball Park, Phoenix, Arizona
|align=left|
|-
|Win
|5–0–1
|align=left| Battling Blackjack
|KO
|1
|26/03/1954
|align=left| Clifton, Arizona
|align=left|
|-
|Win
|4–0–1
|align=left| Howard King
|TKO
|7
|26/01/1954
|align=left| Olympic Auditorium, Los Angeles
|align=left|
|-
|Win
|3–0–1
|align=left| Lonnie Malone
|TKO
|2
|07/12/1953
|align=left| Arena, South Gate, California
|align=left|
|-
|Win
|2–0–1
|align=left| Joe Louis Brown
|KO
|8
|17/11/1953
|align=left| Phoenix, Arizona
|align=left|
|-
|Draw
|1–0–1
|align=left| Calvin Chambers
|PTS
|4
|29/09/1953
|align=left| Olympic Auditorium, Los Angeles
|align=left|
|-
|Win
|1–0
|align=left| Jimmy Ingram
|PTS
|4
|22/09/1953
|align=left| Olympic Auditorium, Los Angeles
|align=left|

Family
Robert Folley, son of Zora Folley, was fighting in the light heavyweight division making his pro debut at the Felt Forum, on June 19, 1986.

References

External links
  Retrieved on February 5, 2008
 The Rise and Fall of Zora Folley The Sweet Science, September 9, 2005
 After Muhammad, a Graveyard Sports Illustrated, April 3, 1967
 

1932 births
1972 deaths
African-American boxers
Heavyweight boxers
United States Army personnel of the Korean War
Sportspeople from Dallas
Sportspeople from Chandler, Arizona
Arizona city council members
American male boxers
20th-century American politicians
Boxers from Texas
Boxers from Arizona
20th-century African-American politicians
20th-century African-American sportspeople